Alvin Otto Henry Setzepfandt (February 7, 1924 – January 7, 2013) was an American veterinarian and politician.

Born in Eagle Grove, Iowa, Setzepfandt graduated from Will Rogers High School in Tulsa, Oklahoma. During World War II, he served in the United States Veterinary Corps. In 1945, he received his degree in veterinary medicine from Iowa State University. He practiced in Bird Island, Minnesota. He served on the Bird Island City Council 1951 to 1953 and as mayor from 1954 to 1970. From 1971 to 1974, Setzepfandt served as Renville County, Minnesota commissioner. From 1975 to 1977, Setzepfandt served in the Minnesota House of Representatives and then in the Minnesota State Senate from 1977 to 1982. He was a Democrat. He died in Olivia, Minnesota.

Notes

1924 births
2013 deaths
People from Eagle Grove, Iowa
People from Bird Island, Minnesota
Military personnel from Iowa
Iowa State University alumni
American veterinarians
Male veterinarians
County commissioners in Minnesota
Minnesota city council members
Mayors of places in Minnesota
Democratic Party members of the Minnesota House of Representatives
Democratic Party Minnesota state senators